Larry Reed is a shadow puppeteer. Reed is one of the first westerns to train in traditional Balinese shadow theatre and is considered a Dalang, or shadow master. He first began studying in San Francisco Art Institute before moving to study in Bali in the 1970s. Reed founded the company Shadow Light Productions to expose the general public to shadow theater and has created many original works while collaborating with others.   Reed was born in Los Angeles, California but lived most of his life in San Francisco, California.

Biography

Early life
Larry Reed was born on June 21, 1944, in Los Angeles, California. He studied French Theater at Yale University in 1965. He was a Theater Director for Costa Rica University and Nation Theaters in 1966 before getting his Master of Fine Arts at San Francisco Art Institute. In the 1970s, Reed traveled to Bali to learn and was instructed to study the music first. He travelled back to San Francisco and joined the American Association for Eastern Arts, now known as the Center for World Music. The American Association for Eastern Arts was founded in 1963 in San Francisco by Samuel and Luise Scripps with Balasaraswati and Ali Akbar Khan as its first two artist-teachers.

ShadowLight Productions
In 1972, Larry Reed founded ShadowLight Productions. The goal of starting this company was to expose the general public to shadow theatre. Reed began expanding his works and integrating traditional shadow theatre techniques with modern theater and style to better connect with an American audience. Live animation films were produced using shadows and performed behind 15’ x 30’ screens. Each show had puppets, actors, and cutouts illuminated by multiple light sources to create effects live on stage. In the 1990s, Reed invented an ingenious way of casting shadows. It integrated techniques from cinema, modern theatre and dance. He invented a mask that allowed the performers to see their own shadow. In the century old tradition, shows done by shadow masters were often done alone using an open flame as a light source. ShadowLight Productions had a crew of actors with live music played by musicians.

Major works

Shadow Master(1979)
Shadow Master is a documentary directed by Larry Reed that has been shown on both PBS and the Discovery Channel. It is about a family of performers in Bali. It shows an inside view of Balinese life which includes cultural context on theater, music, and dance on the island. The film takes course over two years with Reed living and studying with a dalang, I Wayan Wija, and his extended family.

In Xanadu(1993-1997)
In Xanadu is a Mongolian fantasy written by Zara Housbmand and Larry Reed. The fantasy is about Kubilai Khan and his wife, Chabui, who were inseparable partners. The film includes techniques from Tibetan, Chinese, and Indonesian theater techniques. In Xanadu was featured at the 1997 Henson International Festival of Puppetry in New York City and the Spoleto/USA Festival in Charleston, SC. The film was awarded UNIMA-USA Citation for Excellence, puppetry's highest award.

The Wild Party(1995-1996)
The Wild Party is shadow theater work by Larry Reed, based on the poem by Joseph Moncure March written in 1926.It includes jazz music from Bruce Forman. The poem is about two vaudeville performers, Queenie and Burt, who lead an edgy and decadent life. They throw a party for their friend which leads to an evening with alcohol, drugs, and sex. The film uses firm terminology with modern shadow techniques from the ancient Asian art form.

Mayadanawa(1996)
This is the first ShadowLight giant screen shadow production by Larry Reed, Jaime Kibben, and Nyoman Catra. Created in Bali, musicians, dancers, and shadow casters from the village of Pengosekan, Ubud, performed in the 1996 Walter Spies Festival.  The film tells a tale of a powerful demon, Mayadanawa, who demands Balinese people to only worship him. Because he creates havoc among the people, they appeal to Indra, king of all gods, to chase him away.

Ambrosia of Immortality(1998)
Ambrosia of Immortality or Thirtha Amertha is from the Mahabharata, the great Hindu myth cycle interpreted by Larry Reed and renowned Balinese puppeteer, Wayan Wija. the story is about Hindu culture, about a story of the gods’ coming of age and gaining immortality and rising above the world of demons. The gods have it all and are at war against the demons who want it back. Together they churn the Milky Ocean to create the elixir of immortality but struggle on who gets possession of the powerful ambrosia of immortality.

Coyote's Journey(2000-2001)
Coyote's Journey is a traditional Native California Karuk tale told through shadow theatre. The performance uses both Karuk and English story telling. It features a Karuk elder, “Red Hawk” Thom, a hereditary ceremonial leader, spiritual teacher, and storyteller. The show shows Coyote's adventure and his initiation into the ways of the world.

7 Visions(2002)
7 Visions is written by Octavio Solis, an award-winning playwright and directed by Larry Reed. It explores the roots of Latino heritage and celebrates the Mexican holiday Dia de los Muertos, the Day of the Dead. It has music from Richard Marriot, performed by Cascada de Flores, and is designed by Victor Cartagena. On a mission called Dolores, a man named Encarnacion is confronted by his future self, an irreverent skeleton, or calaca which leads Encarnacion on a vision quest of self-discovery.

Monkey King At Spider Cave(2006-2007)
Monkey King at Spider Cave, directed by Larry Reed & Chia-yin Cheng, is performed by both American and Taiwanese artists. Monkey King at Spider Cave is inspired by, Journey of the West, published in the 16th century during the Ming Dynasty. Journey to the West is very popular in operas and cartoons throughout Asia. In this film, a Buddhist High Priest and his animal disciples go on a quest to bring Buddhist Scriptures to China. They are endangered by mythical demons and monsters such as the demonic spider women and an evil alchemist.

Filmography

Awards and honors

References 

1944 births
Living people